The 1970 Western Michigan Broncos football team represented Western Michigan University in the Mid-American Conference (MAC) during the 1970 NCAA University Division football season.  In their seventh season under head coach Bill Doolittle, the Broncos compiled a 7–3 record (2–3 against MAC opponents), finished in fourth place in the MAC, and outscored their opponents, 277 to 132.  The team played its home games at Waldo Stadium in Kalamazoo, Michigan.

The team's statistical leaders included Ted Grignon with 1,001 passing yards, Roger Lawson with 1,205 rushing yards, and Greg Flaska with 372 receiving yards. Safety Vern Davis and tight end Greg Flaska were the team captains. Fullback Roger Lawson received the team's most outstanding player award.

Schedule

References

Western Michigan
Western Michigan Broncos football seasons
Western Michigan Broncos football